Pronuba gracilis is a species of beetle in the family Cerambycidae. It was described by Hovore and Giesbert in 1990.

References

Eburiini
Beetles described in 1990